Pop Cutie! Street Fashion Simulation, known in Japan as That's QT, is a fashion design and business management simulation video game developed and published by Koei for the Nintendo DS handheld video game console.

Gameplay
In Pop Cutie!, the player is put in charge of a fashion boutique, and is required to design, and sell clothes. Making clothes requires collecting keywords, which certain combination of words creates certain pieces of clothing. To sell your clothes, you must set up a store, and stock it with your items, as well as hire employees to take care of the store. You are set against rivals, who like you are selling clothes. In game you can also take part in "fashion battles", in which you are put against a rival to design an outfit based on a certain number of items. Your outfit is then judged on several criteria.

The game is broke into several stages, in which you must meet a certain objective to get to the next stage. In different stages your store is located in a different part of town, as well, the size of your store also changes, as well as your rivals.

Reception

Pop Cutie! Street Fashion Simulation received a score of 7.5 out of 10 from IGN, and a score of 7/10 from Game Zone. Criticisms concerned the pace of the game, as well as the difficulty of controls at some points.

References

External links
Pop Cutie! Street Fashion Simulation Official American site

2008 video games
Koei games
Nintendo DS games
Nintendo DS-only games
Multiplayer video games
Business simulation games
Video games developed in Japan